Hans Werner Meyer (born 14 April 1964 in Hamburg, West Germany) is a German film and television actor.

Life and career
Hans-Werner Meyer attended the Albert Schweitzer Gymnasium in Hamburg. He studied at the 
School for Music and Theater in Hannover and started his acting career at the  Residenztheater in Munich. In 1993 he went to Berlin and worked at the  Schaubühne am Lehniner Platz with renowned directors such as Andrea Breth, Luc Bondy, Leander Haußmann, Robert Lepage.

His first film was Charlie & Louise in 1992 directed by Joseph Vilsmaier,  followed by more movie and television work. In 1997 Meyer gave up  his Schaubühne engagement and mainly concentrated on film and TV  work. Meanwhile he has starred or featured in about 80 film or TV productions, among them the 48 episodes of the crime TV series  “Die Cleveren”, with Meyer starring as a police psychologist, for which he was awarded the Bavarian TV award. In 2000 and 2001 he was a nominee for the German TV award.

In the following years his roles became more and more versatile, comprising diverse characters,  such as long distance runner Dieter Baumann in “Ich will laufen – der Fall Dieter Baumann” (English: “I want to run – the case of Dieter Baumann” or the son of a Prussian Officer, Albrecht Sterenberg, who slowly develops insanity in the historical two-part TV production “Der weiße Afrikaner” (English: The white African”).  He also  acted as Thomas Menz, a loser suffering from posttraumatic stress disorder in Doppelter Einsatz – Fluch des Feuers .

Meyer published his first audio book "Spider" in 2007 and was awarded the "Ohrkanus Award".   
  
Since April 2006 Meyer has been an honorary board member of the German actors’ trade union Bundesverband der Film- und Fernsehschauspieler.

Hans Werner Meyer is married to the British actress Jacqueline Macaulay.

Selected filmography

Movies 
 1993: Charlie & Louise – Das doppelte Lottchen
 1994: Der Schatten des Schreibers
 1996: Busenfreunde
 1997: Ende des Frühlings
 1998: Marlene
 2000: Laissez-Passer
 2006: 
 2008: Der Baader Meinhof Komplex
 2009: 
 2010: Einer wie Bruno
 2013: Adieu Paris

Television 
 1997: It Happened in Broad Daylight
 1997: Schimanski: 
 1998: Hauptsache Leben
 1998–2006: Die Cleveren (TV series)
 1999: Und morgen geht die Sonne wieder auf
 2000: Vera Brühne
 2001: Liebe darf alles
 2001: Eine außergewöhnliche Affäre
 2001: Tatort: Gute Freunde
 2003: Der weiße Afrikaner
 2004: Ich will laufen – Der Fall Dieter Baumann
 2004: Doppelter Einsatz: Der Fluch des Feuers
 2005: Contergan
 2005: Was für ein schöner Tag
 2006: Das Geheimnis von Loch Ness
 2006: Prager Botschaft
 2007: Ich leih' mir eine Familie
 2008: Mordshunger
 2008: Wir sind das Volk – Liebe kennt keine Grenzen
 2010: Das zweite Wunder von Loch Ness
 2011: Die Schäferin
 2011:

References

External links

1964 births
Living people
Male actors from Hamburg
German male film actors
German male television actors
German male stage actors
20th-century German male actors
21st-century German male actors